Marisora alliacea is a species of skink found in Costa Rica and Nicaragua.

References

Marisora
Reptiles described in 1875
Taxa named by Edward Drinker Cope